Astrid Naemi Söderbergh Widding (born 27 May 1963) is a Swedish film studies scholar. She is Professor of film studies and Rector (i.e. Vice-Chancellor) of Stockholm University since 2013. She is a board member of the Swedish Film Institute, a former President of the board of the Ingmar Bergman Foundation and a columnist in the newspaper Svenska Dagbladet. Widding earned her PhD in 1992 at Stockholm University with a dissertation on Andrei Tarkovsky. She was elected as a member of the Royal Swedish Academy of Sciences in 2014 and became a Knight of the French Legion of Honour in 2015.

References 

1963 births
Living people
Academic staff of Stockholm University
Rectors of Stockholm University
Members of the Royal Swedish Academy of Sciences
Women heads of universities and colleges